The 2021 Texas A&M Aggies football team represented Texas A&M University in the 2021 NCAA Division I FBS football season. The Aggies played their home games at Kyle Field in College Station, Texas, and competed in the Western Division of the Southeastern Conference (SEC). They were led by fourth-year head coach Jimbo Fisher.

After finishing the regular season with an 8–4 record, the team accepted a bid to the Gator Bowl. On December 22, the Aggies withdrew from the bowl, after a Covid outbreak left the team without enough players.

Previous season

The 2020 team finished 9–1, with the lone loss coming against Alabama. The season concluded with a 41–27 victory over no. 13 North Carolina in the Orange Bowl. The team finished ranked no. 4 in both the AP Poll and the Coaches Poll.

Offseason

2021 NFL Draft

The following Aggies were selected in the 2021 NFL Draft.

Regular season

Schedule
Texas A&M announced its 2021 football schedule on January 27, 2021. The 2021 schedule will consist of 7 home, 3 away, and 2 neutral games in the regular season.

Coaching staff

Roster

Game summaries

Kent State

Statistics

Colorado

Statistics

Starting quarterback Haynes King suffered a leg injury in the 1st quarter and was replaced by Zach Calzada. On the Monday following the game, head coach Jimbo Fisher said King had a leg fracture and would be out indefinitely.

New Mexico

Statistics

No. 16 Arkansas

Statistics

Mississippi State

Statistics

No. 1 Alabama

Statistics

Texas A&M defeated Alabama for the first time since November 10, 2012. This marked the first time Nick Saban had lost to a former assistant coach; prior to this his record was 24–0 against former assistant coaches. This was Alabama's first loss to an unranked opponent since 2007, where they lost to Louisiana-Monroe. The 100-game win streak against unranked opponents by Alabama was also snapped by Texas A&M. It is also the first time an AP No. 1 team lost to an unranked team since 2008, when USC was defeated by Oregon State.

at Missouri

Statistics

South Carolina

Statistics

No. 13 Auburn

Statistics

at No. 15 Ole Miss

Statistics

Prairie View A&M

Statistics

at LSU

Statistics

Rankings

References

Texas AandM
Texas A&M Aggies football seasons
Texas AandM Aggies football